The 2015 Morocco Tennis Tour – Meknes was a professional tennis tournament played on clay courts. It was the eighth edition of the tournament which was part of the 2015 ATP Challenger Tour. It took place in Meknes, Morocco between 7 and 13 September 2015.

Singles main-draw entrants

Seeds

 1 Rankings are as of August 31, 2015.

Other entrants
The following players received wildcards into the singles main draw:
  Amine Ahouda
  Khalid Allouch
  Ayoub Chakrouni
  Yassine Idmbarek

The following players received entry from the qualifying draw:
  Claudio Fortuna
  Kevin Krawietz
  Tomás Lipovšek Puches
  Yannik Reuter

Champions

Singles

  Daniel Muñoz de la Nava def.  Roberto Carballés Baena 6–4, 6–2

Doubles

  Kevin Krawietz /  Maximilian Marterer def.  Gianluca Naso /  Riccardo Sinicropi 7–5, 6–1

External links
Official Website
ITF Search
ATP official site

Morocco Tennis Tour - Meknes
Morocco Tennis Tour – Meknes
Tennis Tour - Meknes